Princess Louise of Denmark (Louise Caroline Josephine Sophie Thyra Olga) (17 February 1875 – 4 April 1906) was a member of the Danish royal family, the third child and oldest daughter of King Frederick VIII and his wife, Queen Louise. She married her second cousin Prince Friedrich of Schaumburg-Lippe in 1896.

Early life

Princess Louise was born on 17 February 1875 in Frederick VIII's Palace, an 18th-century palace which forms part of the Amalienborg Palace complex in central Copenhagen, during the reign of her paternal grandfather, King Christian IX. She was the third child and first daughter of Crown Prince Frederick of Denmark and his wife Louise of Sweden. Her father was the eldest son of King Christian IX of Denmark and Louise of Hesse-Kassel, and her mother was the only daughter of King Charles XV of Sweden and Norway and Louise of the Netherlands. She was baptised with the names Louise Caroline Josephine Sophie Thyra Olga, and was known as Princess Louise (namesake of her mother, as well as her paternal and maternal grandmothers).

Princess Louise was raised with her siblings in the royal household in Denmark and grew up between her parents' city residence in Copenhagen, the Frederick VIII's Palace at the Amalienborg Palace complex, and their country retreat, the Charlottenlund Palace, located by the coastline of the Øresund strait north of the city. In contrast to the usual practise of the period, where royal children were brought up by governesses, the children were raised by Crown Princess Louise herself. From childhood, Louise was described as a very withdrawn girl with a shy and quiet personality.

Marriage

She married Prince Frederick of Schaumburg-Lippe (1868–1945) at Amalienborg Palace in Copenhagen on 5 May 1896. They had three children.

The couple lived in Ratiboritz Castle in Bohemia. The marriage was not a happy one, however, Princess Louise suffered from melancholy and homesickness, longed for Denmark and spent much time visiting her family, staying for 2 to 3 months at a time. Her father also came and visited with her each year.

Death
Princess Louise died at Ratiboritz Castle on 4 April 1906. The official cause of death of Princess Louise was "cerebral inflammation" caused by meningitis, after weeks of being ill. It was rumoured that she attempted to drown herself in the castle lake on her husband's estate, Ratiboritz, and caught a chill in the attempt, eventually leading to her death.

Issue
Frederick and Louise had three children:
 Princess Marie Luise Dagmar Bathildis Charlotte of Schaumburg-Lippe (10 February 1897 – 1 October 1938) She married Prince Friedrich Sigismund of Prussia and had issue. Prince Friedrich died in a riding accident after a fall from his horse.
 Prince Christian Nikolaus Wilhelm Friedrich Albert Ernst of Schaumburg-Lippe (20 February 1898 – 13 July 1974) He married his first cousin, Princess Feodora of Denmark and had issue.
 Princess Stephanie Alexandra Hermine Thyra Xenia Bathildis Ingeborg of Schaumburg-Lippe (19 December 1899 – 2 May 1925). She married Viktor Adolf, Prince of Bentheim and Steinfurt (1883–1961) (son of Alexis, Prince of Bentheim and Steinfurt and Princess Pauline of Waldeck and Pyrmont) and had two sons; Prince Alexis (30 July 1922 – 2 December 1943, KIA over the Mediterranean) and Prince Christian (b. 9 December 1923). Stephanie died in childbirth with twin boys. Both boys died on 2 May 1925, one stillborn, the other living only a few hours.

Ancestry

References

Citations

Bibliography

External links 

 
 

1875 births
1906 deaths
19th-century Danish people
19th-century Czech people
Danish princesses
House of Glücksburg (Denmark)
Princesses of Schaumburg-Lippe
House of Lippe
Danish expatriates in Austria
Danish expatriates in the Czech lands
Daughters of kings